Kagadi is a town in the Western Region of Uganda. It is the commercial and administrative headquarters of Kagadi District.

Location
The coordinates of the town are 0°56'28.0"N, 30°48'39.0"E (Latitude:0.941111; Longitude: 30.810833).

Population
The 2002 national population census put the population of Kagadi at 13,568. In 2010, the Uganda Bureau of Statistics (UBOS) estimated the population at 20,600. In 2011, UBOS estimated the mid-year population at 21,600. In 2014, the national census put the population at 22,813.

Points of interest
The following points of interest lie within or close to the town limits:

 Offices of Kagadi District local government
 Offices of Kagadi Town Council
 Kagadi Hospital, a 120-bed public hospital administered by the Uganda Ministry of Health
 Mubende–Kakumiro–Kibaale–Kagadi Road joins the Kyenjojo–Kabwoya Road in the middle of town.
 Kagadi Private Hospital, a privately owned and administered healthcare facility
 Kagadi central market 
 Hoima-Fort Portal highway, passing through the eastern suburbs of the town
 African Rural University
 kiraba Rock Hill 
 St. Ambrose medical centre 
 Nursing school

See also
 Bwamiramira
 Kakumiro
 Kibaale
 List of cities and towns in Uganda

References

Kagadi District
Populated places in Western Region, Uganda